Bhadra was an Indian 
Malayalam-language television series directed by Baiju Devaraj and Venu Chalakottu. It premiered on Surya TV on 16 September 2019 and streams on Sun NXT. The show abruptly went off air on 27 March 2020 due to the COVID-19 pandemic.

Plot 
Bhadra is the gem of lady, an epitome of all good qualities. Bhadra lush life enters into undesirable woes when circumstances lead her to be accused of her husband, Madhavan's murder.

Cast 
Seena Antony as Bhadra
Vijay Anand as Madhavan
Sarath Das as Hari
Sreelakshmi as Seethalakshmi
Krishnachandran
Ramesh Kottayam
Mahesh as Swami
Swathi Shaji as Bhama
Thanvi
Vidhya Pillai
Anandhu Sheeja
Kezia Joseph
Vipian James

References 

Malayalam-language television shows
Indian fantasy television series
2019 Indian television series debuts
2020 Indian television series endings
Surya TV original programming